Gholam Mohammad Bazar (also Romanized as Gholām Moḩammad Bāzār; also known as Moḩammad and Muhammad) is a village in Pir Sohrab Rural District, in the Central District of Chabahar County, Sistan and Baluchestan Province, Iran. At the 2006 census, its population was 233, in 36 families.

References 

Populated places in Chabahar County